Mattias Sereinig (born 17 November 1984) is an Austrian football midfielder who plays for SC Wiener Neustadt. He previously played for SK Sturm Graz, SC Rheindorf Altach and SC Wiener Neustadt.

References

1984 births
Living people
Austrian footballers
SK Sturm Graz players
SC Rheindorf Altach players
SC Wiener Neustadt players
Austrian Football Bundesliga players

Association football midfielders